The Raven Mocker, or Kâ'lanû Ahkyeli'skï, is an evil spirit and the most feared of Cherokee witches. According to Cherokee mythology it robs the sick and dying of their heart. Normally appearing as old, withered men and women, or turning completely invisible except to certain medicine men, they take to the air in a fiery shape, with the sounds of a raven's cry and a strong wind as they hunt for their next victim.  After tormenting and killing their victim by slitting the victim's head they consume his heart (doing so without leaving a mark on the victim's skin), and add a year to their life for every year that the slain would have still lived. The sound of a raven mocker means that someone in the area will soon die. 

Raven mockers are normally invisible when feeding, but those with strong medicine can not only spot them but cause them to die within seven days. Medicine men will sometimes stand guard over the dying to prevent raven mockers from stealing the heart of the afflicted.

Raven mockers are feared and envied by the other witches of Cherokee folklore, and their bodies may be abused by said witches after death.

In fiction

Manly Wade Wellman used raven mockers in his novel The Old Gods Waken (1979), where they were one of the many creatures of Appalachian folklore encountered by Silver John.

Scott Nicholson used withered beings much like raven mockers in his novel They Hunger (2007), where they were encountered in a gorge similar to the Linville Gorge Wilderness area of Appalachia.

P.C. Cast also used raven mockers as one of the main groups of villains in her House of Night Series. The story describes them as the being the few living "spirit" children of fallen angel Kalona and any one of his many human mistresses. They have the ability to annoy the living and also steal the lives of those close to death.

Raven mockers are a central theme in the book The Curse of the Raven Mocker, by Marly Youmans, where the main character, Adanta, chases a man who appears to be a raven mocker in order to rescue her enspelled mother.

A raven mocker is the chief antagonist in "Evil in the Night", episode 57 of Walker, Texas Ranger. The raven mocker is depicted as a medicine man with shape shifting abilities and the capability of causing hallucinations in his victims.

Faith Hunter mentions the Raven Mocker in her Jane Yellowrock series whose main character is a skinwalker of Cherokee blood.

References

Cherokee legendary creatures
Legendary crows
American witchcraft